Welbore Ellis, 1st Baron Mendip, PC, FRS (15 December 1713 – 2 February 1802) was a British politician who sat in the House of Commons for 53 years from 1741 to 1794 when he was raised to the peerage as Baron Mendip. He held a number of political offices, including briefly serving as Secretary for the Colonies in 1782 during the American War of Independence.

Background
Ellis was the second but only surviving son of the Most Reverend Welbore Ellis, Bishop of Kildare and Bishop of Meath. He was educated at Westminster School from 1727 to 1732 and then entered Christ Church, Oxford.

Political career
In 1741, he was elected Member of Parliament (MP) for Cricklade, then moved to Weymouth and Melcombe Regis (1747–1761), Aylesbury (1761–1768), Petersfield (1768–1774), Weymouth and Melcombe Regis (1774–1790) and Petersfield (1791–1794).

In 1762, he succeeded Charles Townshend as Secretary at War, and in 1763, he proposed the appropriation of twenty army regiments to the colonies of America. In Parliament, with many others, he opposed the reception of papers from the American Continental Congress. He became Treasurer of the Navy in 1777, then succeeded to the Colonial Secretaryship in 1782, which he held for a matter of months, before the American colonies were lost. In 1784, he became the longest-serving member of the House of Commons (having served for 43 years non-continuously), becoming the honorary Father of the House.

He was created Baron Mendip, of Mendip in the County of Somerset, in 1794 in recognition of his governmental service. The peerage was created with remainder to the three eldest sons of his sister Anne by her husband Henry Agar, of Gowran and Gowran Castle.

Personal life

In 1738 he inherited a large fortune from his uncle, John Ellis and built Clifden House in Brentford.

He married firstly in 1747 Elizabeth, the daughter and heiress of Sir William Stanhope and secondly in 1765 Anne, the daughter of George Stanley of Paultons, Hampshire. Ellis nevertheless died childless in February 1802, aged 88, and was succeeded in the barony according to the special remainder by his great-nephew, Henry Welbore Agar, 2nd Viscount Clifden, who assumed the surname of Ellis two years later.

See also
Viscount Clifden

References

External links

Mendip, Welbore Ellis, 1st Baron
Mendip, Welbore Ellis, 1st Baron
People educated at Westminster School, London
Alumni of Christ Church, Oxford
Members of the Parliament of Great Britain for Cricklade
British MPs 1741–1747
British MPs 1747–1754
British MPs 1754–1761
British MPs 1761–1768
British MPs 1768–1774
British MPs 1774–1780
British MPs 1784–1790
British MPs 1790–1796
Mendip, Welbore Ellis, 1st Baron
Mendip
Secretaries of State for the Colonies
Ellis, Welbore, 1st Baron Mendip
Mendip, Welbore Ellis, 1st Baron
Fellows of the Royal Society